1974 Academy Awards may refer to:

 46th Academy Awards, the Academy Awards ceremony that took place in 1974
 47th Academy Awards, the 1975 ceremony honoring the best in film for 1974